The Trentino-Alto Adige/Südtirol regional election of 1952 took place on 16 November 1952.

The Christian Democracy and the South Tyrolean People's Party won again.

Results

Regional Council

Source: Trentino-Alto Adige/Südtirol Region

Trentino

Source: Trentino-Alto Adige/Südtirol Region

South Tyrol

Source: Trentino-Alto Adige/Südtirol Region

1952 elections in Italy
Elections in Trentino-Alto Adige/Südtirol